Schwana (also spelled Schawana) is an unincorporated community and census-designated place (CDP) in Grant County, Washington, United States. As of the 2020 census, it had a population of 215.

The CDP is in the southwest part of the county, on the eastern bank of the Columbia River, along Washington State Route 243.

References 

Populated places in Grant County, Washington
Census-designated places in Grant County, Washington
Census-designated places in Washington (state)